is a former Japanese rugby union player who played as a wing. He spent his whole career playing for Panasonic Wild Knights in Japan's domestic Top League, playing over 80 times. He was named as a replacement in the Japan squad for the 2007 Rugby World Cup, making 1 appearances in the tournament. He made a further 2 appearances for Japan in his career, scoring two tries.

References

External links
itsrugby.co.uk profile

1983 births
Living people
Japanese rugby union players
Rugby union wings
Saitama Wild Knights players
Asian Games medalists in rugby union
Asian Games gold medalists for Japan
Rugby union players at the 2010 Asian Games
Medalists at the 2010 Asian Games